How to Pick Girls Up! is a 1988 Hong Kong film directed by Wong Jing.

Cast and roles

 Eric Tsang as Tan Yu-lun. a Dj
 Stanley Fung as Fei Chang-fan
 Wilson Lam Chun Yi as He Ma-tong
 Wong Jing as Xin Jie-jing
 Maggie Cheung as Fanny
 Elizabeth Lee as Li Chu Hong
 Sandra Ng as Mei You-kong
 Chingmy Yau as Xiao Bei-bei
 Ellen Chan as Yuki
 Charlie Cho as Councillor Cao Zhu Li
 Au-Yeung Wai Laan
 Cheung Gwok Wa
 Kathy Chow Ho Mei as Didi
 Chow Kong
 Ding Yue
 Shirley Gwan Suet Lai
 Ho Pak Kwong
 Titus Ho Wing Lam
 Jeffrey Hoh Wai Lung as Lai Pi
 Hui Ying Sau as Uncle Lai
 Lai Siu Fong
 Law Ching Ho as Ah Wan
 Lee Chung Ling as Xiang
 Leung Hak Shun
 Margie Tsang as Jenny
 Wong Hung

External links
 
 HK cinemagic entry
 loveHKfilm entry

Hong Kong comedy films
Films directed by Wong Jing
1980s Cantonese-language films
1988 films
1980s Hong Kong films